Trans Anguilla Airways (TAA) is an air charter airline operating to and from Clayton J. Lloyd International Airport to points in the Caribbean.

History 
The Trans Anguilla Airways company was created in 1997. The company was founded by Joshua Gumbs of Rey Hill, and operated by his brother Lincoln Gumbs (manager) and Carl Thomas (chief pilot).

From December 2010 to December 2011, Trans Anguilla Airways was exceptionally authorized to land and take off from the Virgin Gorda Airport, despite the fact that its fleet was not compliant with the airport's standards.

In July 2013, Trans Anguilla Airways launched a new service flight to Sint Eustatius.

Destinations 
TAA operates scheduled 7-minute flights between Anguilla and Sint Maarten.
It offers private charters, shared charters, executive/corporate charters, sightseeing charters, inter-island charters, freight services, and air ambulance services connecting Anguilla to other islands in the Leeward Islands.  TAA also offers sightseeing flights to neighbouring islands.

Fleet

Incidents 
On February 2008, the Pilatus Britten-Norman BN-2A-26 Islander operated by Air Montserrat and leased by Trans Anguilla Airways crashed after takeoff. The small aircraft was programmed for a cargo flight (no commercial passengers). 3 passengers were on board and no fatalities were recorded.

References

External links

Trans Anguilla Website

Airlines of Anguilla